Klaipėdos "Neptūnas" (Women)  is the major women basketball club of Klaipėda, Lithuania participating in Lithuanian Women Basketball League and EuroCup Women. Klaipėdos "Fortūna" basketball club was founded in 2001 as Lemminkainen, in 2012 after end of sponsorship it was changed to "Fortūna". In 2019 after partnership with men's team BC Neptūnas the name changed to Klaipėdos “Neptūnas”.

Season by season

Roster

Notable players

Women's basketball teams in Lithuania
Sport in Klaipėda
Basketball teams established in 2001